The Thompson and Epstein classification is a system of categorizing posterior fracture/dislocations of the hip.

Classification

See also 
Acetabular fracture

References

Hip fracture classifications